Es reiten die Toten so schnell (or: the Vampyre sucking at his own Vein)  (German: "The Dead Ride So Fast") is the seventh album by darkwave act Sopor Aeternus and the Ensemble of Shadows, and was released in 2003. A double vinyl edition and an A5-sized boxed set edition was released, in limited quantities of 666 and 1,999 copies, respectively. The double vinyl edition came with a poster, T-shirt, postcards, communion wafers and "authenticated" graveyard soil.

Overview
For Es reiten die Toten so schnell, Anna-Varney Cantodea went back to her demo tape of the same name and re-recorded all of its songs; the first seven tracks of this album consist of the demo tape in its original sequence. The rest of the album features re-recordings of the bonus tracks that were included on the first Sopor Aeternus album, Ich töte mich..., along with a handful of new songs. "Birth - Fiendish Figuration", Sopor Aeternus' signature song from their first album, appears again in its fourth incarnation on a record. The original version of "Reprise" was a spoken word piece featuring a line from the bridge of "Dead Souls".

John A. Rivers, producer for Swell Maps, Dead Can Dance and Love and Rockets, was brought in to oversee production on 'Es reiten... The album was recorded in England, as opposed to Sopor Aeternus' home country of Germany.

Track listing

Personnel
 Chris Wilson: Violin
 Elizabeth Tollington: Cello
 Marcus Cornall: Double bass, electric bass
 Tonia Price: Clarinet
 Eugene de la Fontaine: Oboe
 Eric Santie-Laa: Cor anglais
 Doreena Gor: Bassoon
 James Cunningham: Trumpet
 Julian Turner: Trombone
 Joan Sweet: Tuba
 Paul Brook: Drums
 Anna-Varney Cantodea: Vocals, all other instruments and programming

References

2003 albums
Sopor Aeternus and The Ensemble of Shadows albums